Informatics Engineering is the direct translation from many southern European languages of an engineering discipline most commonly known in English as Computer Science & Engineering.

In Portugal, for example, universities may use the term Engenharia Informática to refer strictly to Computer Science or a distinction may be made between Computer Engineering and Computer Science.

References

Computer engineering